Pegomya geniculata is a species of fly in the family Anthomyiidae. It has been recorded in the United States (North Carolina), Ireland, and Switzerland. The insect is fungivorous, and uses the fruit bodies of several mushroom species to breed, such as Verpa bohemica.

References 

Anthomyiidae
Insects described in 1834
Muscomorph flies of Europe
Diptera of North America
Taxa named by Peter Friedrich Bouché